The African Cup of Champions Clubs 1977 was the 13th edition of the annual international club football competition held in the CAF region (Africa), the African Cup of Champions Clubs. It determined that year's club champion of association football in Africa.

The tournament was played by 29 teams and used a knock-out format with ties played home and away. Hafia FC from Guinea won that final, and became CAF club champion for the third time.

First round

|}
1

Second round

|}

Quarter-Finals

|}
1 
1

Semi-finals

|}

Final

Champion

Top scorers
The top scorers from the 1977 African Cup of Champions Clubs are as follows:

External links
RSSSF.com

1
African Cup of Champions Clubs